Rhinogobius brunneus, the Amur goby, is a species of fish in the in the family Oxudercidae. 
It is found in the Asian river basins of the seas of the Pacific coasts of Japan, Hokkaido, Ryukyu, Taiwan, the rivers of Korea, continental China, the Philippines and Viet Nam.

Size

References

brunneus
Fish of the Pacific Ocean
Taxa named by Coenraad Jacob Temminck
Taxa named by Hermann Schlegel
Fish described in 1845